The Central Synagogue of Aleppo,, also known as the Great Synagogue of Aleppo, Joab's Synagogue or Al-Bandara Synagogue, has been a Jewish place of worship since the 5th century C.E. in Aleppo. When it functioned, it was considered the main synagogue of the Syrian Jewish community. The synagogue is noted as being the location where the Aleppo codex was housed for over five hundred years until it was removed during the 1947 Aleppo pogrom, during which the synagogue was burned. The synagogue still stands but is in a ruined state.

Brief history
According to tradition, the foundation for the Great Synagogue in Aleppo was constructed by King David's General, Joab ben Zeruiah, (circa 950 BCE), after his conquest of the city. (See 2 Sam 8:3-8); it is still sometimes referred to as Joab's Synagogue. The oldest surviving inscription is from the year 834 C.E. These early buildings were damaged after the Mongol occupation of Aleppo during the 13th century and then turned into a mosque. During the Mongol period (13th century), the synagogue was one of six designated places of refuge in the city, but was destroyed during Tamerlane's subjugation of Aleppo in 1400. The central synagogue was rebuilt at some point in 1418. In August 1626, the Italian Jesuit Pietro Della Valle, (1586–1682), passed through Aleppo and visited the Great Synagogue of that city, which he described in detail:

I went to see the synagogue of the Jews at Aleppo, famed for fairness and antiquity. Their street is entered into by a narrow gate, which is so much lower than the rest, that it is descended to by a considerable number of steps. After I had gone through many of their narrow lanes, which they contrive so, purposely to hide the goodness of the building from the Turks, I came at length to the synagogue; which is a good large square uncovered court, with covered walks or cloysters round about, upheld by double pillars disposed according to good architecture. On the right hand of the entrance, is a kind of great hall, which they make use of for their service in the winter when it is cold or rains; as they do of the court in summer and fair weather: In the middle of the court four pillasters support a cupoletta, under which in a high and decent place, like our altar; lies the volume of the Law, and there also their doctor and principal rabbi stands reading in a kind of musical tone, to whom all the people alternately answer:...

Another account by Elkan Nathan Adler in his book Jews in Many Lands published in 1905 records:
The chief synagogue is very ancient and has many peculiarities. There are several modern additions to it, but the main structure is dated by the Abbe Chagnot as early as the fourth century. It has several inscriptions, some carved on its walls, others painted on them. One is as late as 1861, another as early as 834. The latter is on a chapel stated to have been erected by Mar Ali ben Nathan b. Mebasser b. HaAram....Hebrew inscription... Only four letters are starred, so that the date is probably 1145, sel.=834. The local Jews, however, assume that all the letters count in the perat, but that no thousand is omitted, so that the date would be 654 sel., i.e., 345 of the common era! The letters are certainly archaic, so early an inscription should not be accepted as such without further evidence. There are several chapels surrounding the main building, evidently added from time to time, as the community grew. In each of these minyan is separately held. The chief peculiarity of the Aleppo synagogue is a raised pulpit called the Kiseh Eliyahu approached by a flight of some twenty steps and still used for the solemnization of a Brit milah. Over the synagogue there is a yeshivah and in a secret chamber in the eaves of the roof of one of the side chapels is the genizah.

It had later on undergone a series of modifications until its destruction during the violent attacks against Jews by the local population in December 1947. The building has been badly damaged, but the synagogue still stands and is under full supervision and protection by the Syrian government, although there are no worshippers utilizing it. The synagogue was partially rebuilt (financed by the Syrian Jewish community of New York) and completed in 1992, but it now stands silent and empty.

Occasionally, when possible, trips are made to visit the synagogue by Syrian Jews. An example of such a trip took place on 1 June 2008, when a minyan for the morning services with the Kaddish and Kohanim was conducted by the visitors and former members of the synagogue.

Architecture and layout

The older portions of the synagogue were built in the Byzantine period, perhaps as early as the 9th century. Damaged in the Mongol sack of Aleppo in 1400, the building underwent extensive changes in 1405–1418. With the arrival of the Sephardim in Aleppo in the 16th century, a wing on the eastern side of the main courtyard was built. On the southern part of this wing, facing Jerusalem, is a small room known as the "cave of Elijah." Within the porticoed-courtyard, is a raised, covered "tevah," or reader's platform, which the congregation used seasonally. It was in this form that Della Valle viewed the synagogue. It remained essentially unchanged until it was looted and burned in the riots of 1947.

The synagogue included from the very beginning an adjacent courtyard that was used as an open-air synagogue in the summertime. According to the Talmud, it was customary for a synagogue to have its roof removed during the summer (Baba Batra, 3:2), except for over the Holy Ark and the bimah for the cantor.

The synagogue edifice was divided into three main sections: a central courtyard that separated the western wing, where in modern times the musta'arabi community used to worship, from the eastern section built at a later time during the 16th century and which served as Beth Midrash and prayer hall of the "Francos", i.e. Sephardi Jews that settled in the town after the Spanish exile and other European Jews that happened to sojourn in Aleppo. An additional enclosed small courtyard was bordering the eastern wing farther to the east.

The western hall had three heichaloth (Holy Arks); there were another three heichaloth on the southern wall ("the Zion Wall") of the courtyard, and a seventh Holy Ark, located in the eastern wing close to the courtyard, also on the southern wall pointing to the direction of Jerusalem that was named Cave of Eliyahu or Heichal/Me'arat Eliyahu. Here old Sifrei Torah and Bible manuscripts (Keter) were kept. It is here where the Aleppo codex was housed for over five hundred years until 1947. Keter Aram Soba (The Aleppo Codex) is considered the most authoritative manuscript of the Masoretic text of the Bible. The Jews believed that the day that the Aleppo Codex gets removed from Aleppo is the day that their community will be destroyed. It turns out that this actually occurred.

See also
Syrian Jews
History of the Jews in Syria
Ades Synagogue

References

Adler, Nathan. The Jews of Many Lands, Jewish Publication Society; Philadelphia, 1905.
Zenner, Walter. A Global Community: The Jews from Aleppo, Syria, Wayne State University Press, page 35-39.

External links
The Central Synagogue in Aleppo, Syria
The Jews of Aleppo
Silenced Sacred Places- Robert Lyons
Sephardic Pizmonim Project

Jews and Judaism in Aleppo
Musta'arabi Jews
Sephardi Jewish culture in Asia
Sephardi synagogues
Synagogues in Syria
Jewish Syrian history
Medieval synagogues
9th-century synagogues
Synagogues in the Ottoman Empire
Religious buildings and structures in Aleppo
5th-century establishments in the Byzantine Empire